Charles Bocquet (13 December 1918 – 19 June 1977) was a French biologist, Professor of the University of Paris and an expert on crustaceans.

References 

1918 births
1977 deaths
French biologists
Academic staff of the University of Paris
20th-century biologists